Lost Dutchman State Park is a  state park located in northwestern Pinal County, Arizona on the Apache Trail (State Route 88) north of Apache Junction, near the Superstition Mountains in central Arizona. It is named after the Lost Dutchman's Gold Mine, a famously lost gold mine legendary in the tales of the Old West.

The park provides hiking trails and mountain bike access to the area known as the Superstition Wilderness, as well as views of the mountains.

History
The area was first developed as a day use recreation area by the federal Bureau of Land Management in 1972.  BLM built paved roads into the area as well as a parking lot with picnic facilities, restrooms, and ramadas. A sewage treatment plant was installed to support this, and an electrical system.  In 1973, BLM had discussion with Arizona State Parks about the possible transfer of this area from federal to state jurisdiction.

In 1975, legislation was introduced for the purchase of the area for $2.50 per acre (0.4 ha) through the  Federal Recreation and Public Purposes Act (R&PP), but this legislation did not pass. After the U.S. Congress changed the act to allow states to acquire federal land for recreational purposes at no cost, the  abutting the Tonto National Forest was transferred on September 13, 1977, via legislative action to the state of Arizona, creating the Lost Dutchman State Park.

Features 
The park offers camping facilities, day use parking and acts as a trailhead for the trails leading into the Tonto National Forest in which the Superstition Mountains are located.  Some of the most popular walks are from the park onto the National Forest Service trails that lead across the western face of the Superstitions (Jacob's Crosscut trail) and up the face of this edge using Siphon Draw trail.  Many people confuse these National Forest trails with trails that are maintained by Lost Dutchman State Park.

Siphon Draw and Superstition Ridgeline Trail

Siphon Draw to Flatiron
Siphon Draw is a popular trail, and leads to the iconic "Flatiron" which looks like a ship's bow jutting out of the side of the mountain range. The last mile of hiking up to the Flatiron is a steep boulder scramble. The land is classed as in maintained wilderness area and does not offer trail signs or markers. The last  of the trail to the Flatiron are a class four scramble called 'The Wall'. Park Rangers recommend gloves. The last mile is not suitable for hiking with dogs.

Superstition Ridgeline Flatiron to Peralta Trailhead
The section of the trail from Lost Dutchman State Park to the Basin, halfway up, is well marked and popular, and required route finding skills are minimal. The last mile up to the Flatiron at the top of the ridge is unmarked wilderness area. From the Flatiron along the top of the ridge to Peralta Trailhead, the trail is much less obvious as it gets much less traffic, marked only by cairns. This area is extremely remote and can be accessed only the trailheads at each end. Hog Canyon or Hieroglyphics Canyon provide possible escape routes in case of emergency, but these trails are more rugged and require more advanced route finding skill than the ridgeline itself. Because of the remote and difficult nature of these canyons, hikers should prepare to finish the entire hike and bring emergency gear with them.

This hike should not be attempted in summer. There is no water along the route, and  little shade, and the amount of water that must be consumed may exceed the carrying capacity of even the strongest hikers. Even in winter or shoulder season, each hiker should carry between one and two gallons of pure water.

However, the accumulated elevation gain is about  more than Bright Angel Trail in the Grand Canyon. Furthermore, Bright Angel Trail has water available from potable water stations, and from proximity to Bright Angel Creek and the Colorado River, while the Superstition Ridgeline does not have water.

Proposed closure
The park was scheduled to close on June 3, 2010. A man from Katy, Texas donated $8,000 so the park could stay open.

References

External links
 Lost Dutchman State Park

1977 establishments in Arizona
Parks in Pinal County, Arizona
Protected areas established in 1977
State parks of Arizona